Machine Dreams is the second studio album by Swedish electronic music band Little Dragon. It was released on 17 August 2009 by Peacefrog Records.

Composition
In making Machine Dreams, Little Dragon focused more on making uptempo dance tracks suited for live performances than on ballads like they did on their self-titled debut album. Vocalist Yukimi Nagano described the sound and style of Machine Dreams as more "anonymous", electronic and pop-infused than the "naked" sound of their debut. The album's title refers to its instrumentation and sound palette, which is a combination of organic and analog sounds with digitally-produced sonic textures, "machines that sound human with humans playing machine-like parts" in the words of journalist Tim Chester. AllMusic reviewer Andy Kellman described the LP's instrumentation as consisting of "rubbery rhythms and liquid synthesizer patterns", while Patric Fallon of XLR8R compared it to the works of Prince, The Knife and Tom Tom Club.

Cover art
Japanese artist Hideyuki Katsumata, whom the group met via Myspace, was responsible for making the cover art of Machine Dreams. Nagano explained, "We had a mutual respect for each other's work and we found that his expression really added something to our sound. We love him!"

Critical reception

Machine Dreams received generally positive reviews from music critics. At Metacritic, which assigns a normalised rating out of 100 to reviews from mainstream publications, the album received an average score of 74, based on 10 reviews.

Tim Chester of Wondering Sound viewed it as a "more refined version" of Little Dragon's debut album. Andy Kellman of AllMusic praised the album as an "[electric] quiet storm, deceptively intense and even sensual."

In a less enthusiastic review, Loud and Quiet critic Tom Goodwyn described Machines Dream as "slick, efficient pop music", writing that "each song flows beautifully into the next, driven by an equally infectious keyboard groove and comes in a perfect pop song length." However, he also criticized the record for not taking any chances, labeling the lyrical content as "throwaway" and overall calling the album "cold, vacuum packed and devoid of heart and soul."

Track listing

Personnel
Credits adapted from the liner notes of Machine Dreams.

 Little Dragon – production, mixing
 Guy Davie – mastering
 Dimman – backing vocals 
 Hideyuki Katsumata – illustration
 Harry Lindgård – mixing
 Petter Lindgård – mixing
 SEEK – photography
 La Skrocka – timbales

Release history

References

2009 albums
Little Dragon albums
Peacefrog Records albums
New wave albums by Swedish artists